The WS-15, codename Emei, is a Chinese afterburning turbofan engine designed by the Shenyang Aeroengine Research Institute and manufactured by the Xi'an Aero-Engine Corporation.

The WS-15 is intended to power and enable supercruising on the Chengdu J-20.

Design and development
Development of the WS-15 afterburning turbofan engine began in the early 1990s. In 2005, the engine performed successfully on the testbed. An image of the core appeared at the 2006 China International Aviation & Aerospace Exhibition. In 2009, a prototype achieved  and a thrust-to-weight ratio of 9.

In March 2022, Chinese state media reported that the J-20 had performed trials with the engine and experienced significantly improved performance.

Specifications

See also
 Shenyang WS-10
 Guizhou WS-13
 WS-20
 CJ-1000A
 List of aircraft engines
 List of Chinese aircraft engines

References

External links
WS-15

Low-bypass turbofan engines
2000s turbofan engines